David Johnson (born January 16, 1984) is a former professional American soccer player who played for LA Galaxy in the MLS.

Career statistics

Club

Notes

References

1984 births
Living people
American soccer players
American expatriate soccer players
United States men's youth international soccer players
Association football midfielders
Cape Cod Crusaders players
Willem II (football club) players
LA Galaxy players
Chivas USA players
Colorado Rapids players
Puerto Rico Islanders players
Eredivisie players
USL Championship players
Soccer players from Riverside, California
American expatriate sportspeople in the Netherlands
Expatriate footballers in the Netherlands